The County of Périgord was a historical region of France. The name is derived from the ancient Gaul tribe Petrocores, who resisted the Romans. Périgord was a fief of the Duchy of Aquitaine, consisting of the three sub-regions of Périgieux, Bergerac and Sarlat. The Seneschal of Périgord was responsible for the affairs of the county, ruled as a fief by the Counts of Périgord. The county was bounded on the north by Poitou, on the north east by Limousin, on the south-east by Quercy. The seat of the county was at Périgueux. Périgord was one of the main battlegrounds of Hundred Years' War between the French and English in the 14th and 15th centuries. Périgord was eventually absorbed into the Kingdom of France in 1398. The County roughly corresponds to the current Dordogne département.

References

Counties of France